A cognitive computer is a computer that hardwires artificial intelligence and machine-learning algorithms into an integrated circuit (printed circuit board) that closely reproduces the behavior of the human brain. It generally adopts a neuromorphic engineering approach. Synonyms are neuromorphic chip and cognitive chip.

An example of an cognitive computer implemented using neural networks and deep learning techniques is IBM's Watson machine. A subsequent development by IBM is the 2014 TrueNorth microchip architecture, which is designed to be closer in structure to the human brain than the von Neumann architecture used in conventional computers. In 2017 Intel also announced its own version of a cognitive chip in "Loihi", which it intended to be available to university and research labs in 2018. Intel, Qualcomm, and others are improving neuromorphic processors steadily, Intel with its Pohoiki Beach and Springs systems.

IBM TrueNorth chip

TrueNorth was a neuromorphic CMOS integrated circuit produced by IBM in 2014. It is a manycore processor network on a chip design, with 4096 cores, each one having 256 programmable simulated neurons for a total of just over a million neurons. In turn, each neuron has 256 programmable "synapses" that convey the signals between them. Hence, the total number of programmable synapses is just over 268 million (228). Its basic transistor count is 5.4 billion.

Details 
Since memory, computation, and communication are handled in each of the 4096 neurosynaptic cores, TrueNorth circumvents the von Neumann-architecture bottleneck and is very energy-efficient, with IBM claiming a power consumption of 70 milliwatts and a power density that is 1/10,000th of conventional microprocessors. The SyNAPSE chip operates at lower temperatures and power because it only draws power necessary for computation. Skyrmions have been proposed as models of the synapse on a chip.

The neurons are emulated using a Linear-Leak Integrate-and-Fire (LLIF) model, a simplification of the leaky integrate-and-fire model.

According to IBM, it doesn't have a clock and operates on unary numbers and computes by counting up to a maximum of 19 bits. The said cores are event-driven by using both (a)synchronous logic and are  interconnected through an asynchronous packet-switched mesh network on chip (NOC).

IBM developed a new network to program and use TrueNorth. It included simulator, a new programming language, an integrated programming environment and even libraries. This lack of backward compatibility with any previous technology (e.g. C++ compilers) poses serious vendor lock-in risks and other adverse consequences that may prevent it from commercialization in the future.

Research 
In 2018 a cluster of TrueNorth network-linked to a master computer were used in stereo vision research that attempted to extract the depth of rapidly moving objects in a scene.

Intel Loihi chip
Intel's self-learning neuromorphic chip, named Loihi (produced in 2017), perhaps named after the Hawaiian seamount Lōʻihi, offers substantial power efficiency designed after the human brain. Intel claims Loihi is about 1000 times more energy efficient than the general-purpose computing power needed to train the neural networks that rival Loihi's performance. 
In theory, this would support both machine learning training and inference on the same silicon independently of a cloud connection, and more efficient than using convolutional neural networks (CNNs) or deep learning neural networks. Intel points to a system for monitoring a person's heartbeat, taking readings after events such as exercise or eating, and using the cognitive computing chip to normalize the data and work out the ‘normal’ heartbeat. It can then spot abnormalities, but also deal with any new events or conditions.

The first iteration of the Loihi chip was made using Intel's 14 nm fabrication process, and houses 128 clusters of 1,024 artificial neurons each for a total of 131,072 simulated neurons. This offers around 130 million synapses, which is still a rather long way from the human brain's 800 trillion synapses, and behind IBM's TrueNorth, which has around 256 million by using 64 by 4,096 cores.
Loihi is now available for research purposes among more than 40 academic research groups as a USB form factor. Recent developments include a 64 core chip named Pohoiki Beach (after Isaac Hale Beach Park, also known as Pohoiki).

In October 2019, researchers from Rutgers University published a research paper to demonstrate the energy efficiency of Intel's Loihi in solving Simultaneous localization and mapping.

In March 2020, Intel and Cornell University published a research paper to demonstrate the ability of Intel's Loihi to recognize different hazardous materials, which could eventually aid to "diagnose diseases, detect weapons and explosives, find narcotics, and spot signs of smoke and carbon monoxide".

In September 2021, Intel released Loihi 2, which it claims is roughly same, but faster.

SpiNNaker
SpiNNaker (Spiking Neural Network Architecture) is a massively parallel, manycore supercomputer architecture designed by the Advanced Processor Technologies Research Group at the Department of Computer Science, University of Manchester.

Criticism
Critics argue that a room-sized computer – like the case of Watson – is not a viable alternative to a three-pound human brain. Some also cite the difficulty for a single system to bring so many elements together such as the disparate sources of information as well as computing resources.

In 2021, New York Times released the article "What Ever Happened to IBM’s Watson?". They wrote about some costly failures of IBM Watson. One of them, the cancer-related project called Oncology Expert Advisor, was abandoned in 2016 as a costly failure. During the collaboration, IBM Watson could not tap patient data. Watson struggled to decipher doctors’ notes and patient histories.

See also
 AI accelerator
 Cognitive computing
 Computational cognition
 Tensor Processing Unit
 Turing test
 Spiking neural network

References

Further reading
 CES 2018: Intel gives glimpse into mind-blowing future of computing
 
 
 
 
Computers
Unsupervised learning